George Nelson Dalzell (26 April 1921 – 30 April 1989) was a New Zealand rugby union player. A lock, Dalzell represented Canterbury at a provincial level, and was a member of the New Zealand national side, the All Blacks, from 1953 to 1954. He played 22 matches for the All Blacks including five internationals.

References

1921 births
1989 deaths
New Zealand international rugby union players
Canterbury rugby union players
Rugby union locks
Dalzell-Whitelock family
Rugby union players from Canterbury, New Zealand